Statistics of Southern New England Soccer League in season 1919-20.

League standings
                           GP   W   L   T   PTS
 J&P Coats
 General Electrics [Lynn]
 Fall River Rovers

References
Southern New England Soccer League (RSSSF)

1919-20
1919–20 domestic association football leagues
1919–20 in American soccer